Victoria "Vicky" Torres Morales-Reyno (born July 10, 1969) is a broadcast journalist from the Philippines. She is best known for being one of the anchors of GMA Network's early evening newscast 24 Oras with Mike Enriquez and Mel Tiangco as well as for being the host of the Saturday afternoon documentary-drama show Wish Ko Lang! For hosting Wish Ko Lang!, she got the "Best Public Service Program Host" award during the 29th PMPC Star Awards for Television in 2015 given by the Philippine Movie Press Club. She previously anchored Saksi, the late news program of GMA Network, from 1999 to 2014. In GTV, she hosts a magazine news program entitled Good News Kasama si Vicky Morales, which was started in 2011 when GTV was previously known as GMA News TV.

Aside from receiving an award from PMPC, she received different accolades from other local awards including Catholic Mass Media Awards, UP Gandingan, USTv Awards, Gawad Tanglaw, Northwest Samar State University Student Choice Awards, and Anak TV Seal. Her skills as a journalist has also been recognized internationally by the Asian TV Awards, New York Festival, US International Film and Video Awards, and the George Foster Peabody Awards.

Career

College years and ABS-CBN stint
When Vicky Morales entered Ateneo de Manila University, the first course that she took was Bachelor of Science in Management but she later shifted to a communications course, so that, she can be a journalist. During her college years, her professor introduced her to ABS-CBN executive Charo Santos-Concio and then Vicky auditioned to be part of the ABS-CBN Network. Charo wanted her to be an actress but Vicky preferred to be a news reporter. She passed the auditions and then afterwards, she attended training to improve her craft. At one point of her training, she worked with Korina Sanchez in a short time. 

After three months of training, ABS-CBN executives were not satisfied with her performance, thus, she was removed from the training. Although, this was not her last stint from ABS-CBN. She was later hired by Dong Puno as her production staff and later co-anchor on his business program in ABS-CBN. Vicky learned a lot from Dong and she considered him as her mentor.

Also during Vicky's younger years, she appeared at a Coke commercial alongside Gary Valenciano and Sharon Cuneta.

Broadcast journalist at GMA Network
In 1990, after graduating college, Vicky secretly applied for an anchor spot in GMA Headline News (the now-defunct late night English language news program of GMA Network) who would join the program's news presenters Tina Monzon-Palma and Jose Mari Velez. After then GMA's AVP for News Dan de Padua called Vicky, she was eventually hired as the news anchor for GMA Headline News and bested 500 other applicants. She anchored a segment of the said late news program entitled "Good News," which, incidentally, would become the title of her own news magazine program in 2011.

After ending her work at GMA Headline News, then GMA executive Tony Seva asked Vicky to reunite with Dong Puno on his morning news program entitled Business Today. After two years doing a morning show, she returned to evening news and anchored GMA Network News, which, first started in the English language and later reformatted in 1999 in the Filipino language. 

In 1999, Vicky started to be the news presenter of the late night Filipino language news program Saksi. The 1999-2004 edition of Saksi featured her former partner and Imbestigador host Mike Enriquez, who was the co-anchor with her in the 1999 Filipino language edition of GMA Network News. In 2004, Vicky continued to news presenter of the late night Filipino language news program Saksi with new co-anchor Arnold Clavio and a new the program host replaced Bernadette Sembrano of Wish Ko Lang! She was already part of I-Witness before entering Wish Ko Lang!

Upon the opening of the GMA News TV channel in 2011, she was given the program entitled Good News Kasama si Vicky Morales. The channel was later rebranded to GTV and Vicky's show was carried over. On November 10, 2014, Vicky became a co-anchor in GMA Network's 6:30 PM news program, 24 Oras after being with Saksi for the last 15 years and was replaced by Pia Arcangel.

Personal life

Dante Morales and Ma. Luisa Torres Morales are Vicky's parents. Dante, Vicky's father and a medical doctor, was one of the directors of the Manila Jockey Club, which he succeeded from his wife, Ma. Luisa, who was also a board member of the club.

Vicky Morales is married to lawyer Alfonso "King" Reyno since June 2, 2001. Incidentally, King is also part of the Manila Jockey Club just like Vicky's parents as he is the Chief Operating Officer (COO) of the club. On March 19, 2008, for the first time, Vicky gave birth to twin boys, via caesarean operation. On October 9, 2010, their third child was born.

Public image

As a journalist in her television programs, Vicky perceives herself as not the intellectual type nor the hard-hitting, confrontational kind but she will defend a position that she hold dear. In addition, she will deliver the news as who she is, that is, being compassionate. She created a positive public persona that brings hope and simple happiness to her viewers as reflected on her shows Wish Ko Lang! and Good News. Her attitude towards upholding her position was put into test in 2020 when she interviewed Dr. Bong Javier, Makati Medical Center director, regarding the breaching of the COVID-19 protocols by Senator Koko Pimentel at the hospital. The public, particularly netizens, praised Vicky and described her as being frustrated with Pimentel yet calm during the interview.

Despite being recognized as a seasoned journalist, Vicky committed several gaffes on live television. One of which happened on October 12, 2020 in 24 Oras where she can be seen holding a cue card with the text facing the camera. The text contained a Taglish phrase saying "PA-REVIEW NG SCRIPT PLEASE" (PLEASE REVIEW THE SCRIPT). Another blooper happened on May 20, 2021, also in 24 Oras, when she said her outro differently. She uttered "At dahil hindi natutuli…ay natutulog ang balita!" (this can be roughly translated to "And because the news can not be circumcised…oops, is not sleeping") instead of just "At dahil hindi natutulog ang balita!". Although, it seems that Vicky did this in a humorous manner because she said her outro before a report about circumcision during the COVID-19 pandemic and the banter between Mel Tiangco and Mike Enriquez, her co-anchors, about the topic. In an interview, Vicky explained that she did not make a blooper and she said the line on purpose and added that the "news is not circumcised, meaning we do not cut or censor our news to favor anyone."

Television Programs

Notes

References

1969 births
Living people
Ateneo de Manila University alumni
ABS-CBN people
ABS-CBN News and Current Affairs people
GMA Network personalities
GMA Integrated News and Public Affairs people
Filipino television news anchors
People from Manila